The Miss Tourism Zambia  is a beauty pageant in Zambia since 2004. The pageant is unrelated to Miss Universe Zambia, Miss World Zambia or Miss Earth Zambia.

History
Began in 2004 the ownership of Miss Tourism Zambia is Caroline Makasa who also franchised the Miss International for Zambia since 2004. The pageant aims to market the country's major tourist attractions which include the world famous Victoria Falls, vast wildlife resources, varied scenery, wilderness, diverse culture, national heritage, good weather, adventure activities, including hunting. These features are what are illustrated as themes and concepts in the pageant, which is among the consistently organised in the country. As the pageant also serves as a model and talent search competition, the judges will be looking for a youth tourism ambassador and advocate for wildlife and protection of the environment and climate change.

The Miss International Zambia allowed to 10 Province ambassadors to compete in National level.

Trademarks
The Miss Tourism Zambia business name is registered at the Patents and Companies Registration Agency (PACRA) which is a semi-autonomous executive agency of the Zambian Ministry of Commerce, Trade and Industry. Its principal functions are to operate a legal system for registration and protection of commercial and industrial property and to serve as a legal depository of the information tendered for registration.

Titleholders
Color key

The Miss Tourism Zambia is also called as Miss International Zambia. Since 2014 the winner represents the country at the Miss International. On occasion, when the winner does not qualify (due to age) for either contest, a runner-up is sent. While the pageant also franchises other pageants such as Face of Beauty International, Miss Tourism World and Miss Tourism International.

International pageants
Color key

The Miss International is the only one Big Four pageant in under Miss Tourism Zambia directorship. While other Tourism pageants have added on Miss Tourism Zambia list. Zambia has existed competing in Miss International history since 2004. In 2004 Cynthia Kanema is the only one Miss Zambia who represented Zambia in Big Four pageants; began with Miss World 2003, Miss Universe 2005, Miss Earth 2005 then Miss International 2005 in Japan.

Miss International Zambia

References

External links
Miss Tourism Zambia official site

Zambia
Beauty pageants in Zambia
Recurring events established in 2004
Zambian awards
2004 establishments in Zambia